William Trask (15 July 1859 – 24 June 1949) was an English cricketer who played for Somerset between 1882 and 1900. A right-hand batsman and occasional right-arm slow bowler, Trask made 48 appearances for his county, scoring 1,225 runs and taking 12 wickets. His cousin, John Trask, also played for Somerset.

External links
 

1859 births
1949 deaths
Somerset cricketers